Nowruzi (also Romanized as Nowrūzī and Naurūzi; also known as Kalāteh-ye Nowrūzī) is a village in Quchan Atiq Rural District, in the Central District of Quchan County, Razavi Khorasan Province, Iran. At the 2006 census, its population was 573, in 139 families.

References 

Populated places in Quchan County